Miss Sixty (stylized as MISS SIXTY or MISS 60) is an Italian fashion brand specializing in denim ready-to-wear and fashion accessories.

History
Wicky Hassan founded Miss Sixty in 1991.

In 2000, they launched their own line of footwear, followed by  eyewear in 2002 and  children's clothing in 2004.

In 2010, Miss Sixty closed half of their 20 remaining stores in the US following the closure of two stores the previous year.

In 2012, it was acquired by a Chinese company Trendy International Group.

Trendy International 
Trendy International is a Chinese fashion house founded in 1999, owns domestic women's brands Ochirly and Five Plus as well as male casualwear line Trendiano. The Chinese fashion group is present in more than 290 cities around the world and operates more than 3,000 shops, according to its website. In 2015, Trendy International set up a joint venture with U.K. clothing chain SuperGroup Plc to expand the “Superdry” brand into China.

Locations

References

External links 

Clothing brands of Italy
Jeans by brand
Watch brands
Clothing companies established in 1991
Eyewear companies of Italy
Eyewear brands of Italy
Italian companies established in 1991
1990s fashion
2000s fashion
2010s fashion